Svetlana Ivanovna Gerasimenko is a Soviet and Tajikistani astronomer of Ukrainian origin and discoverer of comet 67P/Churyumov–Gerasimenko.

Discovery of comet 67P/Churyumov–Gerasimenko 

On 11 September 1969 Gerasimenko while working at the Alma-Ata Astrophysical Institute, near Almaty, the then-capital city of Kazakh Soviet Socialist Republic, Soviet Union photographed the comet 32P/Comas Solà using a 50-cm Maksutov telescope.

After she returned to her home institute, Klim Ivanovych Churyumov of the Kyiv National University's Astronomical Observatory examined this photograph and found a cometary object near the edge of the plate, but assumed that this was Comas Solà. On 22 October, about a month after the photograph was taken, he discovered that the object could not be Comas Solà, because it was 2-3 degrees off the expected position. Further scrutiny produced a faint image of Comas Solà at its expected position on the plate, thus proving that the other object was a different comet. By looking through all the material collected they found this new object on four more plates, dated 9 and 21 September.

Honors
Named after her
Periodic comet 67P/Churyumov–Gerasimenko
Minor planet 3945 Gerasimenko

See also
 Timeline of women in science

References and notes

1945 births
Soviet cosmologists
Discoverers of comets
Women astronomers
Living people
Tajikistani scientists
Soviet astronomers
Taras Shevchenko National University of Kyiv alumni
People from Baryshivka
Tajikistani women scientists